Sternarchella schotti is a species of weakly electric knifefish in the family Apteronotidae. This species is endemic to Brazil where it is found in the Amazon River basin, and is sometimes kept in aquaria.  The species grows to approximately 20 cm in length, and has a pale pink color in life with brown speckling along the dorsal surface of the head and body.  As with many other ghost knifefishes (Apteronotidae) this species is aggressive with other electric fish species (Gymnotiformes), but is often compatible in captivity with species in other orders, such as catfish and angelfish.  A recommended diet for S. schotti is frozen or live blood worms and insect larva, and diced meat.

References

Apteronotidae
Fish of South America
Fish of Brazil
Endemic fauna of Brazil
Taxa named by Franz Steindachner
Fish described in 1868